Eve is a 2015 Christian fantasy novel written by William P. Young.

Plot
A retelling of the biblical fall of man told from a female perspective, the novel tells the story of Lilly Fields, the broken daughter of Eve.

References

External links
 

2015 American novels
2015 Canadian novels
English-language novels
American Christian novels
Canadian fantasy novels
Cultural depictions of Adam and Eve